The École Nationale Supérieure d'Architecture de Paris-Belleville is a French grande école and school of architecture. It is currently ranked as the best architecture school in France. The school is recognized for its focus on sustainability, and its students have received awards for adaptable designs encouraging new attitudes towards waste. The school has partnerships with 66 international universities, including La Sapienza in Rome and the University of Hong Kong.

History
In 1969 it was officially recognized under the name UP8 (unité pédagogique d'architecture n°8, architectural teaching unit no. 8), and it has since occupied various re-purposed quarters, including Les Halles until their demolition, as well as a former Meccano factory in the Belleville section of Paris. In 1986 it was renamed the École d'architecture de Paris-Belleville and UP7 and UP5 were merged into it. It took its current name in 2005.

Research
The research arm of the school is the Institut Parisien de Recherche: Architecture, Urbanistique, Société (IPRAUS), which emphasises interdisciplinary approaches.

References

External links
 Official website

Paris
Belleville, Paris
Architecture
19th arrondissement of Paris
Buildings and structures in the 20th arrondissement of Paris
Educational institutions established in 1969